Allama is a 2017 Indian Kannada musical drama Historical film directed by T. S. Nagabharana. The film stars Dhananjay and Meghana Raj in the lead roles. Principal photography of the film started in late 2015. It was released theatrically on 26 January 2017.

The film was nominated as India's entry for the International Council for Film, Television and Audio-visual Communication (ICFT) UNESCO Gandhi Medal. At the 64th National Film Awards, the film won awards for Best Music Direction for Songs & Best Background Score (Bapu Padmanabha) and Best Make-up Artist (N. K. Ramakrishna).

Plot 
The film captures the story of the rebellious thinker Allama, also known as Allama Prabhu."Allama" is a film about 12th century metaphysician, a son of a temple dancer who embarks on a quest for knowledge and answers to his four core sentiments, yearning, and obsession – Maddales, failures and self-realization.

Cast 

 Dhananjay as Allama Prabhu
 Meghana Raj as Maya Devi, a temple dancer
 Taushir
 Lakshmi Gopalaswamy as Allama's mother
 Sanchari Vijay as Basavanna
 Ramakrishna
 Prasanna Shetty as Bahuroopi Shivayya
 Mico Manju as Siddarama
 Bajarangi Chetan as Shambhunatha
 Ashalatha
 Shrutha Bharana as Akkamahadevi

Controversy 
The film landed in a controversy prior to its release in January 2016, after groups such as Rashtriya Basavadal and Basava Peetha staged demonstrations in Dharwad calling for its ban. They alleged that the film wrongly depicts the ritual of wearing miniaturized iconographic form of the deity Shiva, the Jyotirlinga. They claimed that, instead, Ishtalinga should have been depicted. The film shows the worship of Lingam performed placing it on the devotee's right hand, when they claimed that history states that it was done by keeping it in the left hand. The protesters also said that Allama Prabhu and Akka Mahadevi are depicted in the film without wearing the lingam. They claimed that "all these scenes prove that it is a systematic approach to fabricate vachana sahitya", in a memorandum submitted to the Chief Minister of Karnataka calling for the film's ban.

Soundtrack 

Bapu Padmanabha scored the film's background and the soundtrack. The soundtrack album consists of 18 tracks. It includes 14 vachanas; 11 of Allama Prabhu, and 1 each of Basava, Akka Mahadevi and Siddheshwar. The album was released on 31 March 2016 in Bangalore.

Awards and nominations
64th National Film Awards
 Best Music Direction — Songs - Bapu Padmanabha
 Best Music Direction - Best Background Score — Bapu Padmanabha
 Best Make-up Artist — N. K. Ramakrishna

65th Filmfare Awards South
 Filmfare Critics Award for Best Actor – South - Dhananjay

References

External links

2017 films
Indian historical musical films
Indian biographical drama films
2010s Kannada-language films
Indian musical drama films
Films that won the National Film Award for Best Make-up
2010s musical drama films
2017 biographical drama films
2017 drama films
Films directed by T. S. Nagabharana